Ricky Alan Berry (October 6, 1964 – August 14, 1989) was an American professional basketball player in the National Basketball Association (NBA) for the Sacramento Kings.

Early life
Berry was born in Lansing, Michigan in 1964, when his father Bill Berry was a student-athlete at Michigan State University. The Berry family moved to the Sacramento, California area in 1966 when Bill Berry became head coach at a local high school and later Cosumnes River Junior College. Berry attended Live Oak High School in Morgan Hill, California when his father became head coach at San Jose State in 1979.

Basketball career
After graduating from high school, he played for Oregon State in the 1983–84 season, and then transferred to San Jose State in 1984 to play under his father Bill Berry. After sitting out one year per transfer rules, Berry played for the San Jose State Spartans from 1985 to 1988. Berry was selected 18th overall in the 1988 NBA draft by the Sacramento Kings and had a solid rookie season, averaging 11.0 points, 3.1 rebounds, 1.3 assists while shooting 40.6 percent from three-point range.

Berry is one of only three former San Jose State players to have his jersey retired, when San Jose State retired his number 34 jersey.

Death
In the 1989 off-season, and just weeks before his 25th birthday, Berry was found dead after a self-inflicted gunshot. He had showed no signs of depression, but left a suicide note in which he reportedly wrote that his wife did not love him and was taking advantage of him.

Career statistics

NBA

Source

Regular season

|-
| style="text-align:left;"|
| style="text-align:left;"|Sacramento
| 64 || 21 || 22.0 || .450 || .406 || .789 || 3.1 || 1.3 || .6 || .3 || 11.0

See also
 List of basketball players who died during their careers

References

External links

 Article about Ricky Berry's NBA signing (published August 3, 1988) at The New York Times
 Article about Berry's suicide (published August 15, 1989) at The New York Times
 'He was Reggie Miller with a handle': Thirty years ago, the NBA lost Ricky Berry (published August 14, 2019, Mark J. Spears) @ theundefeated.com

1964 births
1989 suicides
American men's basketball players
Basketball players at the 1987 Pan American Games
Basketball players from Sacramento, California
Basketball players from Michigan
Medalists at the 1987 Pan American Games
Oregon State Beavers men's basketball players
Pan American Games medalists in basketball
Pan American Games silver medalists for the United States
People from Fair Oaks, California
People from Morgan Hill, California
Sacramento Kings draft picks
Sacramento Kings players
San Jose State Spartans men's basketball players
Small forwards
Sportspeople from Lansing, Michigan
Suicides by firearm in California